Çamlıca Hill, aka Big Çamlıca Hill to differentiate it from the nearby Little Çamlıca Hill, is a hill in the Üsküdar district of the Asian side of Istanbul, Turkey.

The hill is a popular visitor attraction with Ottoman-themed teahouses, cafes and a restaurant inside a public park with monumental trees, flower gardens and fountains, run by the Istanbul Metropolitan Municipality.

Noteworthy structures

Çamlıca Mosque
On completion in 2019, Çamlıca Mosque became the largest mosque in Asia Minor, able to accommodate 63,000 people and incorporating a museum, art gallery, library, conference hall and underground parking lot.

Çamlıca Tower
Prior to 2021 numerous radio masts and towers (such as Çamlıca TRT Television Tower) occupied much of the available land on the hill. The Turkish Ministry of Transport and Infrastructure decided to consolidate all the broadcasting facilities to a single tower freeing up much of the land on the hill.

References

External links

Landforms of Istanbul Province
Hills of Turkey
Üsküdar
Tourist attractions in Istanbul
Bosphorus